Chernoyarsky District is an administrative and municipal district (raion), one of the eleven in Astrakhan Oblast, Russia. It is located in the north of the oblast. Its administrative center is the rural locality (a selo) of Chyorny Yar. As of the 2010 Census, the total population of the district was 20,220, with the population of Chyorny Yar accounting for 38.5% of that number.

History
The district was first established in July 1928 by merging Chernoyarskaya Volost and a part of Kamennoyarskaya Volost of Stalingrad Governorate with three rural localities in Yenotayevsky District. In 1931, the district was transferred to Lower Volga Krai but was moved back to Astrakhan Oblast in October 1947. In December 1962, the district was dissolved and merged into Yenotayevsky District. On March 2, 1964, the district was re-established.

References

Notes

Sources

Districts of Astrakhan Oblast
States and territories established in 1928
States and territories disestablished in 1962
States and territories established in 1964
 
